Seaton Dunes and Common is a 312.1 hectare biological Site of Special Scientific Interest in Hartlepool, County Durham, England notified in 1966. Part of it is a Local Nature Reserve.

SSSIs are designated by Natural England, formally English Nature, which uses the 1974–1996 county system. This means there is no grouping of SSSIs by Hartlepool unitary authority, or County Durham which is the relevant ceremonial county . As such Seaton Dunes and Common is one of 18 SSSIs in the Cleveland area of search.

References

External links
 English Nature (SSSI information)
 Site boundary map at English Nature's "Nature on the Map" website

Sites of Special Scientific Interest in Cleveland, England
Sites of Special Scientific Interest notified in 1966
Local Nature Reserves in County Durham
Dunes of England